The Rhythm Dukes was a short-lived band featuring Jerry Miller and Don Stevenson of Moby Grape, subsequently joined by Bill Champlin, of the Sons of Champlin, and later of Chicago.

History
In the late summer of 1969, following the release of Truly Fine Citizen, Moby Grape's last album for Columbia, Jerry Miller and Don Stevenson joined with John Barrett (bass) and John "Fuzzy" Oxendine (drums) to form The Rhythm Dukes.  Don Stevenson played guitar, rather than drums.  It is speculated that he left the band shortly after its formation for that reason, preferring to remain a drummer.

The band came together at Jerry Miller's initiative, at a time when the future of Moby Grape was uncertain.  Moby Grape members had been shocked by Bob Mosley's abrupt departure to join the Marines, shortly after the release of Moby Grape '69. This added to uncertainties that commenced at the time of the 1968 departure of Skip Spence from the band, as the result of a six month involuntary psychiatric committal during the course of recording Wow/Grape Jam.  The recording of Truly Fine Citizen in 1969 had been similarly strained, in that Columbia Records had imposed a three day limit on recording time, thus demonstrating little support for Moby Grape's future.

The band lived together in Santa Cruz and, following Stevenson's departure, was joined by Bill Champlin on organ and vocals.  The future of Champlin's band, The Sons of Champlin, was at that time uncertain, similar to the situation which Miller and Stevenson had faced.  Champlin, along with Miller, became the group's principal songwriters.  The Rhythm Dukes shared the stage with such artists as Albert Collins, Lee Michaels, The Flying Burrito Brothers, Canned Heat, The Grateful Dead and Cat Mother & the All Night Newsboys, generally being second-billed. They recorded one album in 1970, which saw release in 2005 as Flashback.

The band existed from 1969-1971.  Despite Columbia's attitude towards Moby Grape, Miller was still subject to contractual obligations to Columbia, which were disruptive to Rhythm Dukes commitments.  Champlin consequently left the band, to continue with the Sons of Champlin.  Miller, Barrett and Oxendine continued the band for a short period thereafter, with such musicians as guitarists Russell Dahneke and Ned Torney, the latter being a founding member of the Chocolate Watchband.   Miller would later rejoin Stevenson and the other original members of Moby Grape to record 20 Granite Creek, (1971), which effectively ended The Rhythm Dukes.  Champlin would continue playing and recording with The Sons of Champlin for the balance of the 1970s, prior to commencing a solo career and later joining Chicago.

Discography
2005 Flashback (Website distribution; recorded 1970)

References

External links
Rhythm Dukes Website

1969 establishments in California
Musical groups from California